The 1988 NCAA Skiing Championships were contested at the Middlebury College Snow Bowl in Hancock, Vermont as part of the 35th annual NCAA-sanctioned ski tournament to determine the individual and team national champions of men's and women's collegiate slalom skiing and cross-country skiing in the United States.

Two-time defending champions Utah, coached by Pat Miller, claimed their sixth team national championship, 37 points ahead of Vermont in the cumulative team standings.

Venue

This year's championships were contested at the Middlebury College Snow Bowl in Hancock, Vermont. Middlebury College served as hosts.

These were the sixth championships held in the state of Vermont (1955, 1961, 1973, 1980, 1986, and 1988).

Program

Men's events
 Slalom
 Giant slalom
 Cross country
 Cross country relay

Women's events
 Slalom
 Giant slalom
 Cross country
 Cross country relay

Team scoring

See also
List of NCAA skiing programs

References

1988 in sports in Vermont
NCAA Skiing Championships
NCAA Skiing Championships
1988 in alpine skiing
1988 in cross-country skiing